The Tita Vendia vase is a ceramic impasto pithos (wine container made around 620-600 BC, most likely in Rome). The pithos, which exists only as an incomplete set of sherds, carries one of two earliest known inscriptions in Latin language (the Vendia inscription) and is usually, but not unanimously, interpreted as the earliest instance of a bipartite female Latin name with praenomen and gentilicum.

The sherds of the vase were found by Raniero Mengarelli and deposited in the collection of Museo di Villa Giulia. The exact location of the find is unknown but it probably occurred in Cerveteri (ancient Caere). The vase belongs to a type found in Southern Etruria. In its original form, based on the collection of sherds found, it was likely to have been approximately 35 centimetres tall and 45 centimetres wide. The letters, 15 to 25 millimetres tall, had been scratched near the bottom. They were inscribed by a right handed artisan, using reversed letter S (Ƨ), and with letters VH instead of normal F (vhecet instead of fecit; according to Baccum, this rules out Faliscan origin of the vase). The inscription reads:

ECOVRNATITAVENDIASMAMAR EDVHE

The lacuna between MAMAR and EDVHE is ten to twelve letters wide. Only part of it has been reliably filled by interpreters. The missing part probably contained the name of the second potter; the first potter is unanimously identified as Mamarcos or Mamarce. With the lacuna partially filled the inscription is expanded into: 

ECO VRNA TITA VENDIAS MAMAR[COS M]ED VHE[CED]

The most common English interpretation of this text is:

I am the urn of Tita Vendia. Mamar[cos had me made].Clarkson and Horrocks, p. 29.

In this interpretation, archaic eco is used where we would expect normative Latin ego, since Latin had not yet developed a separate symbol for the voiced velar [g]; the personal name Vendias uses archaic genitive declension (as in paterfamilias) which is omitted in Tita, most likely due to a writing error. There are also alternative interpretations:
 that vrna connects  to tita as vrna tvta, i.e. "this whole urn".
 that tita should be interpreted as an adjective, meaning prosperous.
 that vrna tita is a piggy bank.
 that tita is a teat that feeds Vendia wine.

Notes

References
 Baccum, G. C. L. M. (2009). The Latin dialect of the Ager Faliscus: 150 years of scholarship, Volume 1. Amsterdam University Press. .
 Baldi, Philip (2002). The Foundations of Latin. Walter de Gruyter. .
 Blanck, Horst (2008, in Italian). Il libro nel mondo antico. Ediziono Dedalo. .
 Clackson, James and Horrocks, Geoffrey (2007). The Blackwell History of the Latin Language. Blackwell Publishing, Oxford. .
 Vogt-Spira, Gregor (1989, in German). Studien zur vorliterarischen Periode im frühen Rom. Gunter Narr Verlag. .
 Watkins, Calvert (1995). How to Kill a Dragon: Aspects of Indo-European Poetics. Oxford University Press US. .

Latin inscriptions
Women in ancient Rome
7th-century BC works
Collections of the Villa Giulia
7th century BC in the Roman Kingdom
Individual vases